Spanish Judges is 1999 direct-to-video crime drama film directed by Oz Scott and starring Matthew Lillard and Vincent D'Onofrio. In Australia, the film was released under the title Ruthless Behaviour.

Plot
Jack (Lillard) is a con artist who sets out to enlist a couple to help him with a scam. Jack eventually meets up with two petty criminals, Max (D'Onofrio) and Jamie (Valeria Golino). Max is a small-time thief with high aspirations and low self-esteem, while Max's hot-tempered girlfriend Jamie collects poisons. After a game of cat and mouse, the couple agree to help with Jack in exchange for a piece of the action. Jack's scam involves recovering mysterious stolen merchandise, known as the Spanish Judges, and a briefcase containing a million dollars. With a buyer all lined up, Max and Jamie enlist their friend Piece (Mark Boone Junior), along with his girlfriend Mars Girl (Tamara Mello) for extra help. As the situation explodes, allegiances are tested and the slippery nature of the truth is finally revealed.

Cast
 Matthew Lillard.....Jack
 Vincent D'Onofrio.....Max
 Valeria Golino.....Jamie
 Mark Boone Junior.....Piece
 Tamara Mello....Mars Girl
 David Glen Eisley.....George
 Ed O'Ross.....The Boss Man
 George Griffith.....Griff
 Sam Hiona.....Harry
 Dennis Keiffer.....Lenny
 Rhino Michaels.....Hitman 1
 Dale "Mad Dog" Messmer.....Auctioneer
 J.W. Smith.....Red
 Michael Shamus Wiles.....Wellings

External links
 
 
 

1999 films
American independent films
1999 crime thriller films
American neo-noir films
American heist films
Films directed by Oz Scott
2000s English-language films
1990s English-language films
1990s American films
2000s American films